Reino Tolvanen (31 July 1920, in Viipuri – 21 November 1974, in Pretoria, South Africa) was a Finnish actor who played Antti Rokka in Edvin Laine's movie The Unknown Soldier, based on a book by Väinö Linna.

Tolvanen fought in the Finnish army, navy and air force during the Winter War (Talvisota 30 November 1939 – 13 March 1940) and Continuation War (Jatkasota 25 June 1941 – 19 September 1944), including time as a machine gun sergeant, patrol boat commander and bomb aimer in Bristol Blenheim aircraft. Following the war, he worked as an agronomist, before moving to Australia in 1959 with his wife Kaija. The couple had three boys. Tolvanen found that he was unable to find work as an agronomist in Australia, and the family moved to South Africa in 1970.

Tolvanen worked as an agronomist until his death in Pretoria in 1974.

Filmography

References

1920 births
1974 deaths
Actors from Vyborg
20th-century Finnish male actors
Finnish emigrants to South Africa
Finnish emigrants to Australia
Military personnel from Vyborg